Heworth Interchange consists of a National Rail, Tyne and Wear Metro and bus station. It is located in the suburb of Heworth, Gateshead in Tyne and Wear, England, and opened on 5 November 1979 for rail and bus services. The station joined the Tyne and Wear Metro network around two years later, on 15 November 1981.

Tyne and Wear Metro 
Heworth is a Tyne and Wear Metro station, serving the suburbs of Felling and Heworth, Gateshead in Tyne and Wear. It joined the network on 15 November 1981, following the opening of the third phase of the network, between Haymarket and Heworth.

History 
The Tyne and Wear Metro station opened over two years later than the adjacent rail station, serving as a replacement for former rail stations at Felling and Pelaw, which were closed by British Rail on 5 November 1979, ahead of conversion work to join the Tyne and Wear Metro network.

Opening initially as a terminus station, trains reversed in the platforms, using the crossovers to the west of the station in passenger service. Reversals later took place at the new sidings at Pelaw, once they had been completed.

On 24 March 1984, the network was further extended south to South Shields, with the station opening to through services. In the following year, on 15 September 1985, Pelaw reopened as an intermediate station – almost six years after its closure by British Rail.

Facilities 
Step-free access is available at all stations across the Tyne and Wear Metro network, with two lifts providing step-free access to platforms at Heworth. As part of the Metro: All Change programme, new lifts were installed at Heworth in 2012, with new escalators installed in 2015.

The station is equipped with ticket machines, seating, next train information displays, timetable posters, and an emergency help point on both platforms. Ticket machines are able to accept payment with credit and debit card (including contactless payment), notes and coins.

The station is fitted with automatic ticket barriers, which were installed at 13 stations across the network during the early 2010s, as well as smartcard validators, which feature at all stations.

The houses a coffee kiosk and newsagent's shop in the ticket hall. Additionally, there is the provision for car parking (operated by Gateshead Council), as well as cycle parking at the station, with four cycle lockers, and 25 cycle racks available.

Services
, the station is served by up to ten trains per hour on weekdays and Saturday, and up to eight trains per hour during the evening and on Sunday.

Rolling stock used: Class 599 Metrocar

Art
There are two art installations at Heworth. The first, South Tyne Eye Plan (1990) by Mike Clay, is located on the station concourse, and represents the area of Heworth and Felling between 1988 and 1990 in the form of a "continuous unwinding scroll".

The second, Things Made (1990) by Jenny Cowern, is located on the south and west outer walls of the station building, and is made up of 29 large panels, each of which represent industries that have operated in the area, such as coal mining, glass making, textiles and shipbuilding.

Bus 
Heworth Bus Station opened in November 1979, along with the British Rail station. It is located above the four platforms, and bordered by Sunderland Road and the A184. It is served by Go North East's local bus services, with frequent routes serving Gateshead, as well as Newcastle upon Tyne, South Tyneside and Washington.

The bus station has seven departure stands (lettered A–F and X), each of which is fitted with a waiting shelter, seating, next bus information displays, and timetable posters. It was refurbished in November 2012, at a cost of £200,000.
Buses from here are the:Connections 4 to Houghton le Spring, Crusader 27 to Jarrow/South Shields, 83A to Chester Le Street

National Rail 

Heworth is a railway station on the Durham Coast Line, which runs between Newcastle and Middlesbrough via Hartlepool. It is owned by Network Rail and managed by Northern Trains.

History
The station opened on 5 November 1979, following the closure of nearby Felling and Pelaw by British Rail, ahead of their conversion to join the Tyne and Wear Metro network. Prior to this, passenger trains ran on the southern pair of tracks, which are now used by the Tyne and Wear Metro.

North of Pelaw Junction, heavy rail and light rail services operate separately.

Facilities 
The station has two platforms, both of which have a ticket machine (which accepts card or contactless payment only), seating and an emergency help point. Additionally, there is a waiting shelter on the Middlesbrough-bound platform. There is step-free access to both platforms, which are linked by ramp and road bridge. There are two pay and display car parks (operated by Gateshead Council) and cycle storage at the station.

Services

As of the May 2021 timetable change, the station is served by an hourly service between Newcastle and Middlesbrough. Most trains continue to Hexham (or Carlisle on Sunday) and Nunthorpe. Two trains per day (three on Sunday) continue to Whitby. All services are operated by Northern Trains.

Rolling stock used: Class 156 Super Sprinter and Class 158 Express Sprinter

Gallery

References

External links
 
 

Railway stations in Tyne and Wear
Railway stations opened by British Rail
Railway stations in Great Britain opened in 1979
Northern franchise railway stations
Bus stations in Tyne and Wear